Mohsen Haji-Mirzaei (born 1959) is Iran's former Minister of Education. Mirzaei was nominated by Hassan Rouhani to succeed Mohammad Bathaei. He received a majority vote from the Islamic Consultative Assembly in September 2019.

Life 
Mirzaei earned a Bachelor's degree in Social Sciences from the University of Tehran, a Master's degree in Management from the State Management Center and a Doctorate in Sociology from the Islamic Azad University, Tehran.

Advisors 
Majid Ghadami
Ali Askari 
Reza Madadi 
Mohammadmehdi Nooripour 
Abdorasoul Emadi

References

External links

Iranian political people
Iranian educators
1959 births
Living people
People from Qom